Painted Peak is a prominent peak, 710 m, on the northern spur of the North Masson Range in the Framnes Mountains, Mac. Robertson Land. Mapped by Norwegian cartographers from air photos taken by the Lars Christensen Expedition, 1936–37. Visited by an ANARE (Australian National Antarctic Research Expeditions) party in 1955, and so named because of its conspicuous red-brown coloring.

References

Mountains of Mac. Robertson Land